Rhamnus lanceolata, eastern lanceleaf buckthorn, is a shrub species in the Rhamnaceae (buckthorn family), native to about 20 states in the south-central and midwestern US.

Description

Range

Habitat

Ecology

Etymology

Taxonomy
Rhamnus lanceolata contains the following subspecies:
 Rhamnus lanceolata glabrata
 Rhamnus lanceolata lanceolata

References

Rhamnus (plant)